Blaz may refer to:

The BlazBlue gaming series.
 Blaž, Bosnia and Herzegovina, a village near Višegrad

Given name
 Blaž (given name), a masculine given name

Surname
Tony Blaz (1958-2016), Guam politician
Vicente T. Blaz (aka Ben Blaz)